The Phoenix Police Department is the law enforcement agency responsible for the city of Phoenix, Arizona. As of October 2021, the Phoenix Police Department comprises just under 2,800 officers, some 350 below authorized strength of 3,125 and more than 1,000 support personnel. The department serves a population of more than 1.6 million and patrol almost  of the fifth largest city in the United States. Phoenix has one of the highest rates of police killings in the United States.

History
Phoenix was incorporated as a city on February 5, 1881. Law enforcement was handled by Phoenix city marshals and later by Phoenix police officers. Henry Garfias, the first city marshal, was elected by residents in 1881 in the first elections of the newly incorporated city. For six years, he served as the primary law enforcement officer.

In the early 1900s, the Phoenix Police Department used Old Nelly, the horse, to pull the patrol wagon for officers. Most patrolling, however, was done on foot. The city at this time was only  with a population of 11,134 people. Call boxes were used to notify an officer that headquarters wanted him. These were supplemented by a system of horns and flashing lights.

The first death of a Phoenix police officer in the line of duty in Phoenix occurred on February 5, 1925. Officer Haze Burch was shot and killed by two brothers on the run from authorities. The men were later arrested when they were found hiding at the Tempe Buttes.

In 1929, patrolmen worked six days a week and were paid $100 a month. The police department moved into the west section of the new city-county building at 17 South 2nd Avenue. The building included jail cells on the top two floors. In 1933, Ruth Meicher joined the police department as the first female jail matron. The city at this time was only , with a population of 48,200. In the year prior, the first police radio system in Arizona was installed for the department with the call letters KGZJ.

The department reorganized in 1950 with four divisions, Traffic, Detectives, Patrol and Service Divisions. Officers worked 44 hours per week for $288 per month. In 1974, the Air patrol unit was established initially consisting of one helicopter. A few months later, a fixed wing aircraft and two additional helicopters were added.

In 2008, the department formed the Block Watch program, which is a partnership between citizens and the police department to help deter youth from crime. The department also runs a similar program under the name G.A.I.N. which stands for Getting Arizona Involved in Neighborhoods.

Phoenix police officers shot at least 41 people in 2018, the highest number in the department's history and the highest number of any U.S. city that year, killing at least 19 people.  Of those shot, demographically, Native Americans were the most over-represented group for their population size, while Hispanics—who comprise 43 percent of the city's population—were shot most often overall.

In 2018, the city budget allocated funding for 3,125 officers, but as of June 2020 the department had just under 3,000 officers, of whom more than 1,000 were eligible to retire. As of 2020, the PPD received more than 40 percent of funds allocated in the city's general fund budget.

As of 2020, Phoenix has one of the highest rates of police killings in the United States. Civil rights leaders and community activists have argued that the city's police officers are rarely held accountable for escalating encounters, attacks on residents, using lethal force without considering other options, and making false statements.

On August 5, 2021, the Department of Justice (DOJ) announced an investigation into the Phoenix Police Department and the City of Phoenix.

Controversies 
On March 13, 1963, Phoenix Police officers Carroll Cooley and Wilfred Young arrested Ernesto Miranda for kidnapping, rape, and armed robbery. The department got a written confession by Miranda, after interrogation, without informing him of his rights. This led to the  landmark U.S. Supreme Court case Miranda v. Arizona, as well as the creation of the "Miranda Rights."
On October 5, 2010, Phoenix Police officer Richard Chrisman, responding to a domestic disturbance call, entered a mobile home and killed an unarmed man during a confrontation.  Chrisman was convicted of second degree murder and sentenced to prison.
In August 2011,  Officer Jeffrey Gordon was suspended from his job for four days for touching a female city worker inappropriately. The incident received attention in the press as the policeman was the son of Mayor Phil Gordon.
In September 2011, Officer Jason A. Brooks beat a handcuffed suspect. He resigned from the department and in July 2012 pleaded guilty to a single charge of disorderly conduct and was sentenced to a day on parole.
In July 2012, press reports indicated that Sergeant Arnold Davis was caught on a video camera stealing thousands of dollars from a business while he was there on official business. Davis, represented by a lawyer from the Phoenix Police Sergeants and Lieutenants Association began negotiating an early retirement to avoid criminal charges.
In August 2012, Detective Christopher J. Wilson resigned from the department when he was accused of ten counts of sex with underaged boys. Wilson pleaded not guilty to the  charges.
In December 2012, Detective George Contreras pleaded no contest to a misdemeanor charge that he made false reports concerning after-hours security he work for which he was paid, but that he never performed. He was ordered to pay over $6,000 to groups he had defrauded. Contreras resigned from the department before his court appearance.
In December 2014, Phoenix Police Officer Mark Rine shot twice and killed Rumain Brisbon in a parking garage while Brisbon was trying to pick up food for his family. Brisbon was unarmed and witnesses explained that Rine had not stated any reason as to why he stopped Brisbon. The two men entered a physical altercation, and Rine stated he shot Brisbon because he felt a weapon tucked in his waistband. The City of Phoenix settled with Brison's family for $1.5 million in 2017. Brisbon had a young daughter at the time of his death.
At a protest in August 2017 against a Donald Trump rally, Phoenix Police Officer Christopher Turiano shot a protester in the groin. Turiano was criminally charged for the shooting, but the charges were subsequently dropped. The department's Tactical Response Unit, of which Turiano is a member, responded to the shooting by creating a commemorative challenge coin with a depiction of a protester being shot in the groin on one side and Trump's "Make America Great Again" slogan on the other side. Phoenix Police Chief Jeri Williams was aware of the coins but did not discipline the officers involved.
In 2018, the Phoenix Police Department reported shooting 44 people, more than the number of people shot that year by the LAPD or NYPD. While only 23 of these were fatal, this number was higher than any past year for the department. Additional information from the report details that black and Native American people made up a disproportionate number of the people shot by Phoenix Police Department in 2018. In March 2018, Arizona police officers shot 17 people statewide.
On May 27, 2019, Dravon Ames was dragged out his car, verbally harassed and beaten up by a police officer who accused Ames of stealing a toy from a nearby store. In the car at the time were Ames' pregnant partner, Iesha Harper, who was threatened by the officer at the scene, and their two young children. It is believed that one of the children may have accidentally taken the toy from the store and that neither Ames nor Harper knew of the theft. The officer involved was fired, but the family filed a $10 million claim against the Phoenix Police Department for violating their civil rights. Video footage of this arrest and the treatment of Dravon and his family made national news.
In May 2019, Héctor López was shot and killed by Phoenix Police Officers Nick Calandra and Chad Canedy. The officers received a call regarding a complaint of trespassing early in the morning, and while exact details of the incident are unclear, police say they shot López when he reached to pick up a fallen weapon from outside his vehicle. The death of López led to protests in Phoenix and calls to address police violence within the department. López' family told authorities that he was disabled, nonviolent, and did not deserve to die. While there is no video footage of this incident, Héctor López' family points to the footage of Phoenix PD's treatment of Dravon Ames and his family as evidence of the lack of respect with which officers treat residents.
On May 21, 2020, Ryan Whitaker was shot and killed by Phoenix Police officer Jeff Cooke when he answered his apartment door armed with a weapon. Whitaker was not using the gun in a threatening way, but was armed while officers were responding to a noise complaint at the complex. While Cooke was eventually fired from the department, no criminal charges were filed against him.
On July 4, 2020, James Garcia was shot inside his parked car at a friend's house in Phoenix. While officers claimed that Garcia refused to put a weapon down that was aimed at them, body camera footage released later showed the officer reach in and take the weapon out for Garcia. It was also later admitted by officers that Garcia in no way matched the description of the person that they were searching for at the time of the shooting. Protesters showed up in large numbers after the release of information regarding Garcia's death, and the incident underwent a long and thorough investigation. Chief Jeri Williams was pressured to respond and act to the indecent as it came during the George Floyd protests. Garcia's family filed a claim against the city for $10 million.
In January 2021, the Phoenix Police Department reported shooting at least 25 people in 2020. This is significantly fewer than the number of people shot by PPD in 2018, but still higher than the state or national averages. It is also considerably higher than the number for 2019, which had dropped from that for 2018.
On August 5, 2021, the United States Department of Justice's Office of Public Affairs announced an investigation into the Phoenix Police Department. The investigation looks into the use of deadly force as well as allegations of the department's use of retaliatory action, among other things. The goal of the investigation is to look into police shootings and other controversies within the department and to ensure that those living in Phoenix feel that the department is living up to its promises, policies, procedures, and the law. Starting in 2017, the Phoenix Police Department has been involved with police officer involved shootings at higher rates than other large cities around the country. Further investigation into why this is and how the department could make changes to remedy this have been talked about, but not yet completed.

Structure
The Phoenix Police Department is divided into six divisions: Community and Support Services, Investigations, Management Services, Patrol, Reserve, Strategic and Tactical Services.

Leadership 
In 2016, Jeri L. Williams was appointed as the Phoenix Police Chief. While she grew up in Phoenix, she spent time leading the Oxnard Police Department in California, where  she pushed the use of body cameras. During her time as chief, she led Executive Assistant Chief Michael Kurtenbach, Assistant Chief Sean Patrick Connolly, Assistant Chief Steve Martos, Assistant Director Jesse W. Cooper, and Reserve Assistance Chief Finical. Chief Williams and Phoenix Mayor Kate Gallego agreed to participate fully with and cooperate completely with an investigation by the Department of Justice into the Phoenix Police Department starting in August 2021. Tensions between Phoenix Police Department and the public have risen over the years as citizens feel that civil rights have been breached by Phoenix Police officers.

Patrol Division

The Phoenix Police Department Patrol Division is organized into seven precincts:
Desert Horizon precinct covers 74.92 square miles with an approximate population of 311,770 residents. This precinct also runs the Sunnyslope Neighborhood Police Station.
Black Mountain precinct covers 182 square miles with a population of 224,000 residents.
Cactus Park precinct covers an area of 30 square miles with a population of 188,000 residents. This precinct also is responsible for the Goelet A.C. Beuf Neighborhood Police Station.
Mountain View precinct covers an area of 46 square miles with a population of  214,386.
Central City precinct ty precinct covers 18 square miles with a population of 91,500.
Maryvale-Estrella Mountain precinct covers 75 square miles with a population of 304,546. Effective October 20, 2014, the Maryvale Precinct and Estrella Mountain Precinct combined to form the Maryvale Estrella Mountain Precinct.
South Mountain precinct covers 115.0 square miles with a population of 271,785.

Community and Support Services Division

 Central Booking
 Communications Bureau
 Community Relations Bureau
 Employment Services Bureau
 Information Technology Bureau
 Property Management Bureau
 Strategic Information Bureau
 Training Bureau

Investigations Division

 Family Investigations Bureau
 Violent Crimes Bureau
 Property Crimes Bureau
 Laboratory Services Bureau
 Drug Enforcement Bureau

Strategic and Tactical Services Division

 Airport Bureau
 Air Support Unit
 Canine And Specialty Vehicles
 Homeland Defense Bureau
 Special Assignments Unit
 Tactical Support Bureau
 Transportation Bureau

Management Services Division

 Chiefs Office
 Code Enforcement Unit
 Fiscal management Bureau
 Legal Unit
 Professional Standards Bureau
 Public Affairs Bureau

Rank structure

The position of Executive Assistant Chief is considered second-in-command of the department.  The collar rank insignia is indistinguishable from other Assistant Chiefs. However, the title "Executive Assistant Chief" is inscribed in the title scroll on the top of the breast badge to indicate the position.

After ten years in the rank of Sergeant, employees are authorized to add one rocker to the bottom of the sergeant stripes.  After fifteen years in rank, two rockers are authorized and after twenty years in the rank of sergeant, three rockers are authorized to be added to the sergeant stripes.  There is no associated elevation in actual rank, and no additional pay, as these extra rockers are optional and only meant to distinguish time in the grade and are not a promotion.

The Phoenix Police Department also uses shoulder patches to denote the positions of Sergeant-in-Training and Field Training Officer, although these are not official supervisory ranks.

Resources

Transportation

The Phoenix Police Department uses Ford Crown Victorias and Chevrolet Impalas for the newer cruisers, Chevrolet Tahoes for their SUVs, and Honda ST1300P Motorcycles, Kawasaki 1000 Motorcycles, and Harley-Davidson motorcycles.

Aviation
The department uses three AgustaWestland A119 helicopters.
They also fly five Eurocopter AS350 B3's and an AgustaWestland A109 Power for rescues.

The department also uses a Pilatus PC-12. This aircraft is intended for surveillance, but also serves as a transport. Additionally, the Air Support Unit has three Cessna aircraft; one 1978 182Q, one 1981 172P and a P210R.

Sidearm
Phoenix Police officers will typically be armed with a Glock pistol usually in either .40 S&W or 9mm. The Glock 21 .45 ACP is also authorized.

Gallery

See also

 List of law enforcement agencies in Arizona
 Maricopa County Sheriff's Office
 Phoenix Police Museum

References

External links
 Phoenix Police Department website
 Phoenix Police Museum
 Phoenix Block Watch Advisory Board

Municipal police departments of Arizona
Government of Phoenix, Arizona
1881 establishments in Arizona Territory